Baba Zahed or Babazahed may refer to:
 Baba Zahed, Andika
 Baba Zahed, alternate name of Boneh-ye Baba Zahed
 Baba Zahed, Masjed Soleyman